Paul Towndrow (born 13 December 1978) is a Scottish saxophonist, composer, arranger and educator. He won the Audience Prize at The 2003 World Saxophone Competition and is a member of Scotland’s flagship jazz orchestra, the Scotland National Jazz Orchestra.

His 2009 album, Newology, attracted a four star review in The Guardian.

Discography

Solo
 Paul Towndrow: Colours - 2003 FMR Records
 Paul Towndrow: Out Of Town - 2005 Keywork Records
 Paul Towndrow: Six By Six - 2007 Keywork Records
 Paul Towndrow: Newology - 2009 Keywork Records
 Paul Towndrow Trio: EP1 - 2013 Keywork Records
 Paul Towndrow & Steve Hamilton Duo: We Shine The Sun - 2016 Keywork Records
 Paul Towndrow: Deepening The River - 2020 Keywork Records

References

External links
Paul Towndrow website

1978 births
Living people
Scottish saxophonists
Scottish composers
British music arrangers
People educated at Airdrie Academy
FMR Records artists